The 1896–97 Columbia men's ice hockey season was the inaugural season of play for the program. Columbia University became just the third American university to support an ice hockey team.

Season
A year after Yale played the first intercollegiate game against Johns Hopkins, Columbia organized their own team and found that it had sufficient interest to support two full teams. The team played two practice games in December in order to get their feet wet and help the novice players learn the game. 

Note: Columbia University adopted the Lion as its mascot in 1910.

Roster

Standings

Schedule and Results

|-
!colspan=12 style=";" | Regular Season

References

Columbia Lions men's ice hockey seasons
Columbia
Columbia
Columbia
Columbia